Clayton is a town in northern Concordia Parish, Louisiana, United States. The population was 711 at the 2010 census. Cotton is a principal commodity in the area. Clayton is located on the Tensas River, important for fishing and boating, promoted through a U.S. Army Corps of Engineers-maintained boat launch. The Tensas River merges with the Black River in Jonesville in Catahoula Parish.

Louisiana State Representative Andy Anders is from Clayton and Ferriday.

Among the businesses in the community are Cross Keys Bank and David's Grocery.

A major employer in the town was Clayton Gin Company which closed in the early 2000s and was mostly demolished in the early 2010s.  The Clayton Gin was originally constructed in the 1940s by W. Howard Davis and his brother Doyle E. Davis.  The gin operated under the name "Davis Bros. Gin Co.".  The last surviving brother, Howard Davis, died in 1972 and the gin continued to operate under the management of his son-in-law Sam D. Cole until his death in 1979.  The gin was sold in the early 1980s and continued operation as the "Clayton Gin Company" until the early 2000s.

Geography
Clayton is located in northern Concordia Parish at  (31.718837, -91.538902), along the south bank of the Tensas River. Catahoula Parish is to the north across the river.

Demographics

2020 census

As of the 2020 United States census, there were 584 people, 189 households, and 107 families residing in the town.

2000 census
As of the census of 2000, there were 858 people, 317 households, and 220 families residing in the town. The racial makeup of the town was 31.70% White, 67.25% African American, and 1.05% from two or more races. Hispanic or Latino of any race were 0.47% of the population.

There were 317 households, out of which 34.1% had children under the age of 18 living with them, 32.8% were married couples living together, 31.9% had a female householder with no husband present, and 30.3% were non-families. 24.9% of all households were made up of individuals, and 12.9% had someone living alone who was 65 years of age or older. The average household size was 2.71 and the average family size was 3.24.

In the town, the population was spread out, with 33.4% under the age of 18, 9.6% from 18 to 24, 21.7% from 25 to 44, 21.7% from 45 to 64, and 13.6% who were 65 years of age or older. The median age was 32 years. For every 100 females, there were 90.7 males. For every 100 females age 18 and over, there were 83.6 males.

The median income for a household in the town was $14,100, and the median income for a family was $15,598. Males had a median income of $22,250 versus $12,500 for females. The per capita income for the town was $7,955. About 38.9% of families and 45.3% of the population were below the poverty line, including 59.0% of those under age 18 and 34.9% of those age 65 or over.

References

External links
 Clayton Progress Community Progress Site for Clayton, LA

Towns in Concordia Parish, Louisiana
Towns in Louisiana
Towns in Natchez micropolitan area